Fred Anderson Quartet Volume One is an album by American jazz saxophonist Fred Anderson which was recorded live during the 1998 season at the Chicago club owned by Anderson, the Velvet Lounge, and released on the Asian Improv label. The Anderson's Quartet features longtime partner trumpeter Bill Brimfield, drummer Chad Taylor and Asian American bassist Tatsu Aoki.

Reception

In her review for AllMusic, Joslyn Layne states about Anderson that "His horn has a time-carved warmth that somewhat recalls the warm sound of Hank Mobley and early Ben Webster, but remains entirely Anderson's own sound; when he blows, you can hear all the years of playing behind that sound."

The All About Jazz review by Mark Corroto says "Anderson sounds like a mellow Ornette Coleman on tenor, especially with the addition of Bill Brimfield on trumpet... The grooves, while not laid back, are some of the most accessible and enjoyable free music I’ve heard."

Track listing
All compositions by Fred Anderson
 "The Moon Song" - 14:10
 "Dark Day" - 10:57
 "Get It Right" - 22:22
 "Three on Two" - 22:49

Personnel
Fred Anderson - tenor sax
Bill Brimfield - trumpet
Chad Taylor - drums
Tatsu Aoki - bass

References

1999 live albums
Fred Anderson (musician) live albums